Chronological – by no means complete – list of recordings of Richard Strauss' Vier letzte Lieder.

Recordings

References

Discographies of classical compositions
Songs by Richard Strauss